Nanodacna is a genus of moths in the family Agonoxenidae.

Species
 Nanodacna ancora
 Nanodacna austrocedrella Landry & Adamski, 2004
 Nanodacna indiscriminata
 Nanodacna logistica
 Nanodacna vinacea

References

Agonoxeninae
Moth genera